3-hydroxy-D-aspartate aldolase (D-3-hydroxyaspartate aldolase) is an enzyme with systematic name 3-hydroxy-D-aspartate glyoxylate-lyase (glycine-forming). This enzyme catalyses the following chemical reaction

 (1) threo-3-hydroxy-D-aspartate  glycine + glyoxylate
 (2) D-erythro-3-hydroxyaspartate  glycine + glyoxylate

This enzyme is a pyridoxal-phosphate protein.

References

External links 
 

EC 4.1.3